Bridge FM is an Independent Local Radio station broadcasting to Bridgend County Borough and the surrounding areas. It is owned and operated by Nation Broadcasting and broadcasts on 106.3 FM from studios at the St Hilary transmitter in the Vale of Glamorgan.

The station plays chart music from the 1980s to the present day, alongside local news, travel and community information.

As of December 2022, the station broadcasts to a weekly audience of 16,000, according to RAJAR.

Overview
Bridge FM was formerly owned by Tindle Radio but sold to Town and Country Broadcasting (now Nation Broadcasting) in 2006, becoming the company's fifth local radio station.

Programming
Bridge FM's output is produced and broadcast from Nation Broadcasting's St Hilary studios broadcasting on FM, DAB and Online.  Most programming and presenters is shared with sister stations Radio Pembrokeshire, Bridge FM and Radio Carmarthenshire.

Presenter-led shows air from 6am - 7pm on weekdays, 8am - 6pm on Saturdays and 8am - 9pm on Sundays. Including Lee Jukes who presents the weekday breakfast programme between 6am-10am.

News
Local news bulletins air hourly from 6am - 7pm on weekdays and 7am - 1pm at weekends with headlines on the half-hour during weekday breakfast and drivetime. 

National news bulletins from Sky News Radio air hourly at other times.

References

External links
 

Bridge
Bridgend County Borough
Radio stations established in 2000
Nation Broadcasting